Krk Bridge is a  long reinforced concrete arch bridge connecting the Croatian island of Krk to the mainland. Carrying over a million vehicles per year, it was the last tolled bridge in Croatia that is not part of a motorway until the removal of tolls. The longer of the bridge's two arches is the third-longest concrete arch in the world and the longest outside of China, and among the longest arches of any construction. The bridge was completed and opened in July 1980 and originally named Tito's Bridge in honor of Yugoslav president Josip Broz Tito, who had died two months earlier. The bridge was tolled since its opening until the removal of tolls on 15 June 2020. However, passage was toll free for Krk residents since 1999 and vehicles owned by Krk businesses since the 2000s. When the tolls were removed, passenger cars were being charged 35 kuna, southbound only.

Construction
The bridge was designed by Ilija Stojadinović in cooperation with Vukan Njagulj and Bojan Možina, and built by Mostogradnja Belgrade and Hidroelektra Zagreb between 1976 and 1980. It was designed as a cantilever bridge with  temporary cable-stays. Structurally, the bridge consists of two reinforced concrete arch spans, which rest on the islet of Sveti Marko between Krk and the mainland.

Traffic
Krk Bridge connects the island's 19,383 inhabitants (as of 2011) and its tourist resorts to Jadranska magistrala, the main road along the Adriatic coast. It also connects the city of Rijeka to Rijeka Airport, which is situated on Krk. In the first 20 years of its existence, the bridge was crossed by 27 million vehicles, more than double of ferry traffic to and from the island. Krk Bridge only carries one lane of traffic in each direction, and the increasing levels of traffic warrant a larger replacement bridge which is currently in planning stages.

See also
List of arch bridges by length
List of bridges by length

References

Sources

External links
 

Deck arch bridges
Bridges completed in 1980
Concrete bridges
Buildings and structures in Primorje-Gorski Kotar County
Krk
Cross-sea bridges in Croatia
Transport in Primorje-Gorski Kotar County